Alemannic, or rarely Alemannish (Alemannisch), is a group of High German dialects. The name derives from the ancient Germanic tribal confederation known as the Alamanni ("all men").

Distribution 
Alemannic dialects are spoken by approximately ten million people in several countries:
 In Europe:
 Switzerland: all German-speaking parts of the country except Samnaun
 Germany: centre and south of Baden-Württemberg, Swabia, and certain districts of Bavaria
 Austria: Vorarlberg, Reutte District of Tyrol
 Liechtenstein
 France: Alsace region (Alsatian dialect) and in some villages of the Phalsbourg county, in Lorraine
 Italy: Gressoney-La-Trinité, Gressoney-Saint-Jean, Issime, Alagna Valsesia, Rimella and Formazza, in some other villages almost extinct
Outside Europe:
 United States: Allen and Adams County, Indiana, by the Amish there and also in their daughter settlements in Indiana and other U.S. states.
 Venezuela: Colonia Tovar (Colonia Tovar dialect)

Status 
Alemannic comprises a dialect continuum from the Highest Alemannic spoken in the mountainous south to Swabian in the relatively flat north and more of the characteristics of Standard German the farther north one goes.

In Germany and other European countries, the abstand and ausbau language framework is used to decide what is a language and what is a dialect. According to this framework, Alemannic varieties of German form a dialect continuum and are clearly dialects. Some linguists and organisations that differentiate between languages and dialects primarily on the grounds of mutual intelligibility, such as SIL International and UNESCO, describe Alemannic as one of several independent languages. ISO 639-3 distinguishes four languages: gsw (Alemannic, Alsatian, Swiss German), swg (Swabian), wae (Walser German) and gct (Colonia Tovar German, spoken since 1843 in Venezuela).

Standard German is used in writing and in Germany orally in formal contexts throughout the Alemannic-speaking regions (with the exception of Alsace, where French or the Alsatian dialect of Alemannic is used instead).

Variants 
Alemannic in the broad sense comprises the following variants:
 Swabian (mostly in Swabia, in Germany, covering large parts of Württemberg and all of Bavarian Swabia). For this reason, "Swabian" is also used in opposition to "Alemannic".
 Alemannic in the strict sense:
 Low Alemannic dialects. Subvariants:
 Upper-Rhine Alemannic in Southwestern Baden and its variant Alsatian (in Alsace, France)
 Alemán Coloniero (in Venezuela)
 Basel German (in Basel, Switzerland)
 Lake Constance Alemannic (Bodenseealemannisch) (in Southern Württemberg, Southeastern Baden, Northwestern Vorarlberg), a transitional dialect, close to High Alemannic, with some Swabian features in the vowel system.
 High Alemannic (mostly in Switzerland, parts of Vorarlberg, and in the southern parts of the Black Forest in Germany). Subvariants:
 Bernese German
 Zürich German
 Vorarlbergisch
 Liechtensteinisch
 Highest Alemannic (in the Canton of Valais, in the Walser settlements (e.g., in the canton of Grisons), in the Bernese Oberland and in the German-speaking part of Fribourg) does not have the hiatus diphthongisation of other dialects of German. Subvariants:
 Walliser German
 Walser German

The Alemannic dialects of Switzerland are often called Swiss German or Schwiizerdütsch.

Written Alemannic 
The oldest known texts in Alemannic are brief Elder Futhark inscriptions dating to the sixth century (Bülach fibula, Pforzen buckle, Nordendorf fibula). In the Old High German period, the first coherent texts are recorded in the St. Gall Abbey, among them the eighth-century Paternoster:

Due to the importance of the Carolingian abbeys of St. Gall and Reichenau Island, a considerable part of the Old High German corpus has Alemannic traits. Alemannic Middle High German is less prominent, in spite of the Codex Manesse compiled by Johannes Hadlaub of Zürich. The rise of the Old Swiss Confederacy from the fourteenth century led to the creation of Alemannic Swiss chronicles. Huldrych Zwingli's bible translation of the 1520s (the 1531 Froschauer Bible) was in an Alemannic variant of Early Modern High German. From the seventeenth century, written Alemannic was displaced by Standard German, which emerged from sixteenth century Early Modern High German, in particular in the wake of Martin Luther's bible translation of the 1520s. The 1665 revision of the Froschauer Bible removed the Alemannic elements, approaching the language used by Luther. For this reason, no binding orthographical standard for writing modern Alemannic emerged, and orthographies in use usually compromise between a precise phonological notation, and proximity to the familiar Standard German orthography (in particular for loanwords).

Johann Peter Hebel published his  in 1803. Swiss authors often consciously employ Helvetisms within Standard German, notably Jeremias Gotthelf in his novels set in the Emmental, Friedrich Glauser in his crime stories, and more recently Tim Krohn in his Quatemberkinder.

The poet Ida Ospelt-Amann wrote and published exclusively in the dialect of Vaduz.

Characteristics 
 The diminutive is used frequently in all Alemannic dialects. Northern and eastern dialects use the suffix -le; southern dialects use the suffix -li (Standard German suffix -lein or -chen). As in standard German, these suffixes cause umlaut. Depending on dialect, 'little house' may be Heisle, Hüüsle, Hüüsli or Hiisli (Standard German Häuslein or Häuschen). Some varieties have plural diminutives in -ler, -la or -lich.
High Alemannic, Lake Constance Alemannic and Highest Alemannic dialects exclusively use the Ach-Laut.

See also 
 Alemannic separatism
 German dialects
 Muettersproch-Gsellschaft
 Muggeseggele
 Swiss German

References

External links 

 
 
 Alemannic encyclopedia -German-

 
Language
German dialects
Languages of Germany
Languages of Switzerland
Languages of Liechtenstein
Languages of Piedmont
Languages of Aosta Valley